Propebela scalaris is a species of sea snail, a marine gastropod mollusk in the family Mangeliidae.

Description
The length of the shell varies between 11 mm and 27 mm.

The shell is elongate. The spire is longer than the aperture. The spiral striation is closer, and more uniform than in Propebela rugidata. The apex is rounded acuminate; on the first whorl, only faint spiral ribs (2–3) are visible.

References

 
 Brunel, P.; Bosse, L.; Lamarche, G. (1998). Catalogue of the marine invertebrates of the estuary and Gulf of St. Lawrence. Canadian Special Publication of Fisheries and Aquatic Sciences, 126. 405 p.
 Bogdanov, I. P. Mollusks of Oenopotinae subfamily (Gastropoda, Pectinibranchia, Turridae) in the seas of the USSR. Nauka, 1990.
 Gofas, S.; Le Renard, J.; Bouchet, P. (2001). Mollusca. in: Costello, M.J. et al. (eds), European Register of Marine Species: a check-list of the marine species in Europe and a bibliography of guides to their identification. Patrimoines Naturels. 50: 180–213

External links
  Möller, Hans Peter Christian. Index molluscorum groenlandiæ. CA Reitzell, 1842 
 Sars, G.O. (1878). Bidrag til Kundskaben om Norges arktiske Fauna. I. Mollusca Regionis Arcticae Norvegiae. Oversigt over de i Norges arktiske Region Forekommende Bløddyr. Brøgger, Christiania. xiii + 466 pp., pls 1–34 & I-XVIII
 Trott, T. J. (2004). Cobscook Bay inventory: a historical checklist of marine invertebrates spanning 162 years. Northeastern Naturalist. 11, 261–324
 
 
 Nekhaev, Ivan O. "Marine shell-bearing Gastropoda of Murman (Barents Sea): an annotated check-list." Ruthenica 24.2 (2014): 75

scalaris
Gastropods described in 1842